Batavia School District may refer to:
 Batavia Public School District 101 - Illinois
 Batavia City School District - New York